Jacco Eltingh and Paul Haarhuis were the defending champions.  Mahesh Bhupathi and Leander Paes won in the final 6–4, 6–2, against Eltingh and Haarhuis.

Seeds
All seeds receive a bye into the second round.

Draw

Finals

Top half

Bottom half

External links
 1998 Paris Open Doubles draw

1998 Paris Open
1998 ATP Tour